The 1947 Texas Mines Miners football team was an American football team that represented the Texas School of Mines (now known as the University of Texas at El Paso) as a member of the Border Conference during the 1947 college football season. In its second season under head coach Jack Curtice, the team compiled a 5–3–1 record (3–3–1 against Border Conference opponents), finished fifth in the conference, and outscored opponents by a total of 159 to 79.

Schedule

References

Texas Mines
UTEP Miners football seasons
Texas Mines Miners football